L. spinosa may refer to:
 Lacurbs spinosa, a harvestman species in the genus Lacurbs and the family Biantidae
 Lepidotrigla spinosa, a sea robin species in the genus Lepidotrigla
 Licuala spinosa, a palm species
 Lonicera spinosa, a honeysuckle species in the genus Lonicera
 Lupettiana spinosa, a spider species in the genus Lupettiana
 Lygodesmia spinosa, a wirelettuce species now known as Pleiacanthus spinosus
 Lysiosquilla spinosa, a mantis shrimp species

See also
 Spinosa (disambiguation)